Takydromus sylvaticus, the Chung-an ground lizard, is a species of lizard in the family Lacertidae. It is endemic to China.

References

Takydromus
Reptiles described in 1928
Taxa named by Clifford H. Pope
Endemic fauna of China
Reptiles of China